Andrew Deegan (born 23 March 1995) is an Australian rugby union footballer who plays for Global Rapid Rugby side Western Force. He plays as a fly-half.

Career
Deegan made his Shute Shield for Randwick in 2014. The previous year, he had represented the Australia Schoolboys national team and, in 2015, he gained further international honours when selected for the Australia Under-20s team. In 2016, he scored 194 points, including 5 tries, in 18 games for Randwick, winning the Roscoe Fay Trophy for highest points scorer. Deegan was also part of the NSW Country Eagles team that finished as runners-up in the 2016 National Rugby Championship. In 2016, he was added as a supplementary squad player to the  Super Rugby squad.

In August 2017, Irish provincial team Connacht announced that they had signed Deegan ahead of the 2017–18 Pro14 season.

Super Rugby statistics

References

External links
NSW Waratahs Profile
Itsrugby Profile

1995 births
Living people
People educated at St Joseph's College, Hunters Hill
Australian rugby union players
Rugby union fly-halves
New South Wales Country Eagles players
Connacht Rugby players
Western Force players
Australian expatriate rugby union players
Expatriate rugby union players in Ireland
Australian expatriate sportspeople in Ireland
Melbourne Rebels players
New South Wales Waratahs players
Expatriate rugby union players in Japan
Kurita Water Gush Akishima players
Rugby union players from Sydney